Ulan Melisbek (pronounced ; born March 31, 1975 Bishkek, Kyrgyzstan) is an influential figure in Kyrgyz culture and politics.

Melisbek's website and newspaper were one of the few offerings of public insights into Kyrgyz politics during tumultuous times, especially for Kyrgyz people living abroad. A rising public figure in politics, Melisbek was an influential revolutionary during the Kyrgyz March Revolution in 2005 (24 March 2005).

Melisbek earned a BA in Economics and Management from Turkey's Marmara University and in Law from Kyrgyz State University and a MA in International Law and Economics from the World Trade Institute, located in Switzerland.

Starting his career as a Patent and Trademark attorney, Melisbek founded the Kyrgyz Patent and Trademark Bureau (KPTB) in October 1999. The KPTB specializes in patents, trademarks, copyrights, and industrial designs as well as aiding foreign companies such as British Petroleum, Bulgartabak, and others.  While a member of the Twenty-Second Session of the Administrative Council of the Eurasian Patent Organization, Melisbek held the position of the Deputy Chairman. Melisbek was also responsible for the Kyrgyz Republic's position as the regional coordinator of the World Intellectual Property Organization.  In October 2008, Melisbek began to head the Kyrgyz State Patent Office of Intellectual Property for over a year and a half. After his departure, Melisbek established Melisbek and Partners Consulting, which focuses on protecting client's IP assets.

WikiLeaks appearance 
Mr. Melisbek's name appeared in the leaked diplomatic cable published by WikiLeaks  where he was described as "A Kyrgyz government official, who claimed to be a confidant of President Bakiyev's influential son Maxim". According to the cable, Ulan met with the U.S. Government official to offer his help in keeping the Transit Center at Manas open. The center was supposed to be closed, but Ulan allegedly said that "Maxim was convinced of the benefit of closing the Base, but there was a window of opportunity to "reconvince" Maxim to keep Manas Air Base—if the USG was willing to buy off Maxim".

References 

Notes

 
 
 

1975 births
Living people
People from Bishkek
Kyrgyzstani journalists